DRN or Drn may refer to:

Dark Room Notes, a band originally from Galway, Ireland
Deoranian railway station, serving Deoranian, Uttar Pradesh, India (Indian railways code DRN)
Dirranbandi Airport, Queensland, Australia (IATA code DRN)
Disaster Resource Network, a World Economic Forum initiative
Dorsal raphe nucleus, on the brainstem 
Dragonfly Recording Network, a project of the British Dragonfly Society
Drn (Prague), a polyfunctional building in Prague, Czech Republic
Duirinish railway station, Highland, Scotland (National Rail station code DRN)

See also
 Dharan, Nepal